Admiral Vidal Francisco Soberón Sanz (born May 17, 1953) is a Mexican Navy officer who served as the Secretary of the Navy.

Early life
Admiral Soberón Sanz finished his primary and secondary studies in Mexico City and then in 1970 studied at the Heroica Escuela Naval Militar and graduated in 1975. Later Soberón Sanz made a vocational training specializing in Underwater Weapons, Diploma in Human Rights, Military MBA, Master in National Security, Staff Course, Naval War College USA.

Soberón Sanz was appointed vice-admiral in 2009. Three years later, he became an admiral—the youngest ever in the Navy. Until 30 November 2012, he was private secretary to the head of the Navy, Mariano Francisco Saynez, during the administration of Felipe Calderón Hinojosa.

Naval units under his command
 Deputy Commander of the Third Fleet Ocean Vessels.
 Deputy Commander of Naval Sector Coatzacoalcos.
 Flotilla Commander in the Pacific Naval Force.
 Sector Commander Naval Matamoros, Tamaulipas.
 Director of the School of Destroyers.
 Assistant Chief of Naval Operations.
 Technical Director of the Directorate General of Naval Communications.
 Assistant Chief of Navy Secretary José Ramón Lorenzo Franco.
 Naval Attache to the Republic of Panama, concurring in Nicaragua and Costa Rica.
 Chairman of the Committee on Special Studies of the General Staff of the Navy.
 Secretary to his predecessor Mariano Francisco Saynez.

Military awards
 Persistence of 10, 15, 20, 25, 30, 35 years of service
 Exceptional in Third Class Perseverance 40 years of service
 Naval Merit Award Second Class awarded by the Government of Spain
 Medal of the National Maritime Service in Grade Distinguished Service "Christopher Columbus", awarded by the Government of Panama
 Legion of Merit awarded by the U.S. Secretary of the Navy, Ray Mabus (24 June 2014)

Personal life
He married Georgina Ventura Menchaca in 1982. They have two children: Vidal Francisco and Santiago.

References

1953 births
People of the Mexican Drug War
Living people
Mexican admirals
Foreign recipients of the Legion of Merit
20th-century Mexican military personnel
Secretaries of the Navy (Mexico)